General Charles Grey (15 March 1804 – 31 March 1870) was a British army officer, member of the British House of Commons and political figure in Lower Canada. In later life, he served as private secretary to Prince Albert and later Queen Victoria.

He was born in Northumberland, England, in 1804, the second son of Charles Grey, 2nd Earl Grey, by his wife, the Hon. Mary Ponsonby, daughter of William Ponsonby, 1st Baron Ponsonby. He was the younger brother of Henry, the 3rd Earl Grey. After a good private education he joined the British Army as a sub-lieutenant in 1820 and commanded the 73rd Regiment of Foot from 1833 to 1842.

Grey represented Wycombe in the British House of Commons from 1832 to 1837, defeating Disraeli to win the seat, which he held until 1837.

In 1838 he went to Canada with his brother-in-law, John Lambton, 1st Earl of Durham, where he was named a member of the Executive Council and Special Council of Lower Canada in June of that year, serving until 2 November. He returned to England with Lambton later that month and later obtained the influential position of secretary to Prince Albert from 1849 to 1861 and secretary to the Queen from 1861 until his death in 1870.

He was given the colonelcy of the 3rd (East Kent) Regiment of Foot in 1860, and transferred to the 71st (Highland) Regiment of Foot in 1863, a position he held until his death. He was promoted full general in 1865.

In 1836, he had married Caroline Eliza, daughter of Sir Thomas Harvie Farquhar, 2nd baronet. Their children included:
 Sybil Mary Grey (born 1848), married William Beauclerk, 10th Duke of St Albans 
 Charles Grey (died young in 1855)
 Albert Henry George Grey, 4th Earl Grey, served as Governor-General of Canada.
 Victoria Alexandrina Elizabeth Grey (1853 - 1922), married Lewis Payn Dawnay, son of William Dawnay, 7th Viscount Downe
 Louisa Jane Grey (1855–1949), married William McDonnell, 6th Earl of Antrim, and served as pro tempore Mistress of the Robes to Queen Victoria
 Mary Caroline Grey (1858–1940), married Gilbert Elliot-Murray-Kynynmound, 4th Earl of Minto

In popular culture
A heavily re-imagined version of Grey appears as a character in popular manga and anime franchise Black Butler, with a key role in Black Butler: Book of Murder, as he was a popular character through the series .

References

Sources

bookcase from Charles C Gray 1848

External links 
 

|-

|-

1804 births
1870 deaths
73rd Regiment of Foot officers
British Army generals
Members of the Parliament of the United Kingdom for English constituencies
UK MPs 1832–1835
UK MPs 1835–1837
Younger sons of earls
Children of prime ministers of the United Kingdom
Members of the Special Council of Lower Canada
Private Secretaries to the Sovereign